Akimoto Lake (秋元湖) is a lake that is technically classified as a reservoir. It straddles the border of the village of Kitashiobara and the town of Inawashiro, both in the Yama district of Fukushima Prefecture, Japan. Along with Hibara Lake and Onogawa Lake, it forms what is known as the "Inner Bandai Plateau Tri-Lake Formation".

Overview 
The lake itself did not exist as late as the Meiji period in the area now known as the "Inner Bandai Plateau", which was once the site of the village of Hibara. In 1888, Mount Bandai—which is located to the south—erupted, and part of the mountainside caved in as a result of the accompanying phreatic explosion; a large rockslide—and then mudslide—in the direction of Hibara destroyed the village. It was previously assumed that one large phreatic explosion had occurred, but the destruction of the mountain is now thought to have been caused by several medium-sized explosions.

Rivers like the Nagase River and Onogawa River that flow in the Inner Bandai area became clogged up due to the destruction of the mountain and mudslide; Lake Hibara, Lake Onogawa, Goshiki Marsh and other such dammed lakes were thus formed. Akimoto Lake was formed by the damming of Ōkura River and Nakatsu River. It is the deepest of the lakes in the inner Bandai tri-lake area, and is second to Lake Hibara in surface area.

Akimoto Lake’s water flows in from Nagase River, and forms a delta at its lower section which pours into Lake Inawashiro. Water then flows from Lake Inawashiro into Nippashi River, from which it connects to Agano River at Kitakata City. Because of this path that the water takes, Akimoto Lake is designated under the River Act as part of the Agano River water system, and managed as a class-1 water system by Fukushima Prefecture.

Tourism 
Akimoto Lake, along with Lake Hibara, Lake Onogawa, Goshiki Marsh and others are designated as part of Bandai-Asahi National Park, a major tourist destination in the Aizu region. Particularly noteworthy are the changing colors of the fall leaves, which reflect vividly on the water surface. Caution is necessary as visitors flock to the area in the fall and cause traffic jams along Route 459, which leads to the Inner Bandai tri-lake area. The sun rising over Akimoto Lake is a favorite subject of photographers, and many come in the morning to get shots of the scenery in the morning light.

Boating is permitted on Akimoto Lake. Boats can be rented on a time limit. Fishing is permitted, but numbers of the smallmouth bass—an invasive fish—have been increasing in recent years, drawing bass fishing lovers as well as the ire of the local fishing co-op, which sees the species as posing a threat to local aquatic insects and indigenous fish. There is a bicycling road on the shore of Akimoto Lake, and it is possible to venture out to the Nakatsu ravine on the upper reaches of the Nakatsu River. The lake also has a camping ground, and is popular as a general outdoor spot.

Akimoto Lake is accessible by taking the Ban-etsu Expressway or the Inawashiro-Bandai Highland Interchange to Route 115, and then transferring to Route 459, turning right at Goshiki Marsh Entrance and heading straight. Coming from Mount Adatara, take Route 115 and make a right at the Takamori intersection, going straight on Fukushima Prefectural Road 70—the Fukushima-Azuma-Inner Bandai line—and then transfer to the Bandai-Azuma Lake Line. Coming from this direction, you can view the upper reaches of Akimoto Lake. To access the lake via public transportation, take JR East's Ban-etsu West Line to Inawashiro Station or Kitakata Station and board the Bandai Toto Bus headed for Inner Bandai, get off at Akimoto Lake Entrance, and then proceed on foot.

Hydroelectricity production 
The Agano River water system that Akimoto Lake is a part of has an ample amount of water and flows quickly, making it an ideal spot for the generation of hydroelectricity. In 1889, the first hydroelectricity production on the Agano River water system began with the opening of the Numagami Hydroelectric Plant, which operated via the Asaka Aqueduct.

Later, in the Taishō period, the Inawashiro Hydroelectric Energy Company began full-scale hydroelectricity production on Lake Inawashiro and Nippashi River, and in 1914 boasted what was at the time the largest hydroelectric plant in Japan—Inawashiro Electric Plant #1—successfully completing an overhead high-tension power transmission line that sent electricity to Tokyo. Inawashiro Electric Plant #2 (in 1918) and #3 (in 1926) were later constructed, furthering development of Lake Inawashiro and the Nippashi River.

The Inner Bandai tri-lake area drew attention due to its abundance of water, and in 1923 plans were made for further hydroelectricity generation on Onogawa Lake and Akimoto Lake. The Onogawa Power Plant was completed on Akimoto Lake in 1937, with an output of 34,200 kW made possible by utilizing a tunnel to move water from Onogawa Lake. Construction was later begun on Akimoto Lake, but the wartime Energy Management Act of 1939 was enacted, essentially forcing all electric companies to assimilate with Japan Electric Generation and Transmission Company. Construction under the Japan Electric Generation and Transmission Company proceeded, and Akimoto Power Plant was completed in 1940. In order to generate an effective supply of energy, plans called for an earth dam, increasing the storage capacity of the lake. When the dam was completed, Akimoto Power Plant boasted a permitted output of 107,500 kW, which at the time was the highest on the Agano River water system.

After the war, Japan Electric Generation and Transmission was designated to be broken up under the Economic Decentralization Act, and in 1951 was split into 9 smaller electric companies. The hydroelectric plants around Lake Inawashiro were placed under the management of Tokyo Electric Power Company, Inc., where they remain today. Tokyo Electric Power Company has adjusted the water level of Akimoto Lake in compliance with requests from Fukushima Prefecture.

Multi-purpose dam 

In August 1989, the Inner Bandai area experienced heavy torrential rains. The water level at Akimoto Lake, as well as Lake Onogawa and Lake Hibara, had rapidly risen, and the entire river basin sustained major damage. Akimoto Lake has a drainage pumping station at the center of the dam that is used to discharge excess lake water, but the torrential rains outpaced the station's ability to pump water, making it impossible to regulate the water level properly.  More water than could be handled under water use regulations was being discharged, and the Nagase River eventually flooded, causing even more damage to the surrounding region.

Fukushima Prefecture, shaken by how quickly the river overflowed, drew up new flood prevention plans for the Inner Bandai tri-lake area. Because of the nearby Bandai-Asahi National Park, environmental protection concerns prevented the construction of levees or dikes. It was decided that a multi-purpose dam would be built to facilitate unspecified water utilization, flood control for Lake Hibara, Lake Onogawa and Akimoto Lake, as well as a normal stream level for the Nagase River; work began at the Inner Bandai tri-lake area in 1997 under the Comprehensive River Development Project.

The practice of damming natural lakes for flood prevention and water usage is performed nationwide, with some of the more prominent examples being Lake Biwa, the Seta River Wash Weir, Lake Kasumigaura and the Hitachi River floodgate, which are all under direct control of the Ministry of Land, Infrastructure, Transport and Tourism, and others like Lake Chūzenji/Chūzenji Dam in Tochigi Prefecture and Yogo Lake/Yogo Dam in Shiga Prefecture, which are controlled at the prefectural level. Natural lakes in Fukushima Prefecture that are dammed include Lake Inawashiro and the Jyūryoku Bridge floodgate. Lake Hibara now features a 3.4 meter-high gravity dam, Lake Onogawa has a 4.9 meter-high fill dam, and Akimoto Lake—in addition to its earth dam—now has a gravity dam with an emergency floodgate on its left bank, making it a combined dam. Facilities such as dams, weirs and flood gates enable flood prevention and water usage for natural lakes and marshes, and can be referred to as "water level regulation facilities." While places like Akimoto Lake are in fact lakes, they are classified as dams under river-related regulations.

Due to the fact that each is less than 15 meters in height, they are technically classified as weirs under river law, but they provide valuable service in the form of flood prevention and hydroelectricity generation among the Nagase River, Akimoto Lake and the other Inner Bandai tri-lake area lakes. Work was completed on the secondary dam in 1999, and control over regulation of water levels that had been performed by Tokyo Electric Power Company was thereafter done directly by Fukushima Prefecture's Inawashiro office of civil engineering.

Related links 
List of lakes and marshes in Japan
Dammed lakes
Mount Bandai
Bandai-Asahi National Park
Agano River water system

References 
いいとこ磐梯猪苗代　湖沼・湿原－秋元湖 (Japanese)
建設省河川局監修・全国河川総合開発促進期成同盟会編　『日本の多目的ダム　直轄編』1980年版：山海堂　1980年
建設省河川局監修・全国河川総合開発促進期成同盟会編　『日本の多目的ダム　補助編』1980年版：山海堂　1980年

Dams in Fukushima Prefecture
Dams completed in 1999
1999 establishments in Japan